Art is a Celtic masculine given name, meaning "bear", thus figuratively "champion". Thou Art Crone.

Origins and history 

Art meant the ‘bear’ in Celtic languages. The name derives from Proto-Celtic *artos (“bear”) (compare Cornish arth, Welsh arth, Breton arzh), from Proto-Indo-European *h₂ŕ̥tḱos (“bear”). With bears the local apex predator, Art figuratively referred to a ‘champion’ and two Legendary High Kings of Ireland had the name, Art mac Cuinn and Art mac Lugdach. 

The name Arthur is frequently shortened to Art, but its etymological link to Art is in debate. The names Stewart or Stuart can also be shortened to Art, but are less common.

People with the name Art
 Art Acord (short for Arthemus)
 Art Aoinfhear
 Art Atwood
 Art Baker (coach)
 Art Baltazar (short for Arthee)
 Art Binkowski (short for Artur)
 Art Brenner
 Art Brion (short for Arturo)
 Art Bulla
 Art Caomhánach Mac Murchadha
 Art Chester
 Art Christmas
 Art Cohn
 Art Cowie
 Art Crews
 Art Cross
 Art D'Lugoff
 Art Davie
 Art Dorrington
 Art Drysdale
 Art Fazil
 Art Fowler (actor)
 Art Frahm
 Art Gillham
 Art Ginsburg
 Art Good
 Art Green (Canadian football)
 Art Hampson
 Art Hoelskoetter
 Art Hovhannisyan (short for Artyom)
 Art Hupy
 Art Imlech, High King of Ireland
 Art Ingels

As a hypocorism for Arthur
 Art Adams
 Art Agnos, American politician and former Mayor of San Francisco, California
 Art Albrecht
 Art Alexakis
 Art Alexandre
 Art Allison
 Art Anderson
 Art Aragon
 Art Arfons
 Art Asbury
 Art Babbitt
 Art Bader
 Art Baker (actor)
 Art Baker (gridiron football)
 Art Bakeraitis
 Art Balinger
 Art Ball
 Art Barnes
 Art Baron
 Art Barr
 Art Bartlett
 Art Bassett
 Art Becker
 Art Behm
 Art Bell, American radio broadcaster
 Art Benedict
 Art Berglund
 Art Bergmann
 Art Best
 Art Bisch
 Art Blakey, American jazz musician
 Art Boileau, Canadian long-distance runner
 Art Boyce
 Art Bragg
 Art Bramhall
 Art Brandau
 Art Briles
 Art Brouthers
 Art Buchwald, American humorist
 Art Bues
 Art Bultman
 Art Burns
 Art Burris
 Art Buss
 Art Butler
 Art Carmody
 Art Carney, American actor
 Art Carney (American football)
 Art Ceccarelli
 Art Chantry
 Art Chapman
 Art Chapman (basketball)
 Art Chin
 Art Chisholm
 Art Clokey
 Art Collins (basketball)
 Arthur R. Collins
 Art Cook
 Art Corcoran
 Art Cosgrove
 Art Coulter
 Art Croft
 Art Curtis
 Art Daney
 Art Davis
 Art Davis (American football)
 Art DeCarlo
 Art Decatur
 Art Deibel
 Art Delaney
 Art Demling
 Art Demmas
 Art Devlin (baseball)
 Art Devlin (ski jumper)
 Art Ditmar
 Art Dixon
 Art Doering
 Art Doll
 Art Donahoe
 Art Donahue
 Art Donovan, former American football defensive tackle
 Art Dufelmeier
 Art Dula
 Art Duncan
 Art Eason
 Art Eggleton, Canadian politician
 Art Ehlers
 Art Ellefson
 Art Evans
 Art Evans (baseball)
 Art Eve
 Art Ewoldt
 Art Farmer (1928–1999), American jazz trumpeter and flugelhorn player
 Art Farrell
 Art Feltman
 Art Fiala
 Art Finley
 Art Fleming
 Art Fletcher
 Art Foley
 Art Folz
 Art Fowler
 Art Frantz
 Art Fromme
 Art Fry
 Art Gardiner
 Art Gardner
 Art Garfunkel, American singer-songwriter and actor
 Art Garibaldi
 Art Garvey
 Art Gauthier
 Art Gilkey
 Art Gilmore
 Art Giroux
 Art Gleeson
 Art Gob
 Art Goodwin
 Art Graham
 Art Green (artist)
 Art Greenhaw
 Art Griggs
 Art Hagan
 Art Haggard
 Art Hanes
 Art Hanger
 Art Harnden
 Art Harris
 Art Hauger
 Art Hauser
 Art Herchenratter
 Art Herman
 Art Herring
 Art Hershey
 Art Heyman (1941–2012), American basketball player
 Art Hickman
 Art Hillebrand
 Art Hillhouse
 Art Hindle
 Art Hinkel
 Art Hoag
 Art Hodes
 Art Hodgins
 Art Hoppe
 Art Houtteman
 Art Howe, former Major League Baseball player and manager, and current bench coach of the Texas Rangers
 Art Howe (American football)
 Art Hsu
 Art Hughes (American soccer), American soccer player
 Art Hughes (Canadian soccer), Canadian soccer player
 Art Hunter
 Art Hurst
 Art Hussey
 Art Jackson, former National Hockey League player
 Art Jackson (sport shooter)
 Art Jacobs
 Art Jahn
 Art James
 Art James (baseball)
 Art Janov
 Art Jarrett
 Art Jarrett Sr.
 Art Jarvinen
 Art Jimmerson
 Art Johnson (1920s pitcher)
 Art Johnson (1940s pitcher)
 Art Johnson (racing driver)
 Art Johnston
 Art Jones (American football)
 Art Jones (baseball)
 Art Jones (ice hockey)
 Art C. Jones
 Art Jorgens
 Art Kahler
 Art Kahn
 Art Kane
 Art Katz
 Art Kaufman
 Art Kenney
 Art Klein
 Art Knapp
 Art Koeninger
 Art Kores
 Art Kruger
 Art Kuehn
 Art Kunkin
 Art Kusnyer
 Art LaFleur
 Art LaVigne
 Art Laboe
 Art Laffer
 Art Lande
 Art Larsen
 Art Lasky
 Art Lee
 Art Lesieur
 Art Lewis
 Art Link
 Art Linkletter, American television host
 Art Linson
 Art Lloyd
 Art Long
 Art Longsjo
 Art Lopatka
 Art López
 Art Loudell
 Art Lund
 Art Lundahl
 Art McCoy
 Art mac Cuinn, High King of Ireland
 Art Mac Cumhaigh
 Art McFarland
 Art mac Flaitnia
 Art McGovern
 Art Macioszczyk
 Art McKay
 Art McKinlay
 Art McLarney
 Art mac Lugdach, High King of Ireland
 Art McNally
 Art McRory
 Art Madison
 Art Madrid
 Art Mahaffey
 Art Mahan
 Art Malik, Pakistani-born British actor
 Art Malone
 Art Malone (American football)
 Art Mann
 Art Mardigan
 Art Martinich
 Art Matsu
 Art Matthews
 Art Mazmanian
 Art Mengo
 Art Merewether
 Art Mergenthal
 Art Metrano
 Art Michalik
 Art Michaluk
 Art Miki
 Art Mills
 Art Modell
 Art Mollner
 Art Monk, American football player
 Art Mooney
 Art Moore
 Art Mór Mac Murchadha Caomhánach
 Art Munson
 Art Murakowski
 Art Murphy
 Art Naftalin
 Art Napolitano
 Art Nehf
 Art Neville
 Art News
 Art Nichols
 Art Noonan
 Art O'Connor
 Art O'Donnell
 Art Ó Laoghaire
 Art O'Leary
 Art Óenfer
 Art Oliver
 Art Olivier
 Art Orloske
 Art Ortego
 Art Pallan
 Art Parakhouski
 Art Parks
 Art Passarella
 Art Paul
 Art Pennington
 Art Pepper, American jazz alto saxophonist.
 Art Phelan
 Art Phillips
 Art Phillips (composer)
 Art Phipps
 Art Pinajian
 Art Poe
 Art Pollard
 Art Pope
 Art Porter, Jr.
 Art Porter, Sr.
 Art Powell (wide receiver)
 Art Powell (coach)
 Art Price
 Art Pulaski
 Art Quimby
 Art Quirk
 Art Raimo
 Art Ramasasa
 Art Ranney
 Art Rascon
 Art Rebel
 Art Regner
 Art Reinhart
 Art Reinholz
 Art Renner
 Art Rice-Jones
 Art Rico
 Art Robinson
 Art Rochester
 Art Rooijakkers
 Art Rooney, former National Football League executive and owner of the Pittsburgh Steelers
 Art Rooney II
 Art Rosenfeld
 Art Ross, former National Hockey League defenseman and Canadian ice hockey executive
 Art Ruble
 Art Rupe
 Art Rust, Jr.
 Art Ryerson
 Art Saaf
 Art Saha
 Art Sanders
 Art Sansom
 Art Satherley
 Art Savage
 Art Scammell
 Art Schallock
 Art Scharein
 Art Schlichter
 Art Paul Schlosser
 Art Schmaehl
 Art Scholl
 Art Schult
 Art Schwind
 Art Seaberg
Art Shamsky (born 1941), American Major League Baseball outfielder and Israel Baseball League manager
 Art Shapiro
 Art Shay
 Art Shead
 Art Shefte
 Art Shell
 Art Sherman (born 1937), American horse trainer and jockey
 Art Shires
 Art Simek
 Art Simmons
 Art Skov
 Art Sladen
 Art Smith (actor)
 Art Smith (baseball)
 Art Smith (chef)
 Art Smith (ice hockey, born 1906)
 Art Smith (pilot)
 Art Somers
 Art Sour
 Art Spander
 Art Spector
 Art Spiegelman, American comics artist
 Art Spinney
 Art Spivack
 Art Staed
 Art Statuto
 Art Stephenson
 Art Stevens
 Art Stevenson
 Art Stewart
 Art Still
 Art Stock Books
 Art Stokes
 Art Stratton
 Art Streiber
 Art Stringer
 Art Strobel
 Art Sullivan
 Art Swann
 Art Sykes
 Art Tatum, American jazz pianist
 Art Taylor
 Art Teele
 Art Thalasso
 Art Themen
 Art Thibert
 Art Thieme
 Art Thomason
 Art Thompson
 Art Thoms
 Art Todd
 Art Torres
 Art Townsend (hockey player)
 Art Townsend (publisher)
 Art Tripp
 Art Tucker
 Art Turnbull
 Art Turner
 Art Twineham
 Art Uallach Ua Ruairc
 Art Valpey
 Art Van Damme
 Art Walker (gridiron football)
 Art Walker (triple jumper)
 Art Wall, Jr.
 Art Wallace
 Art Watson
 Art Weaver
 Art Webb
 Art Webb 1986
 Art Webster
 Art Weiner
 Art Welch
 Art Westerberg
 Art Wheeler
 Art White
 Art Whitney
 Art Whizin
 Art Wiebe
 Art Williams
 Art Williams (counterfeiter)
 Art Williams (insurance executive)
 Art Williams (outfielder)
 Art Williams (umpire)
 Art Wilson
 Art Winfree
 Art Wittich
 Art Wolfe
 Art Wolff
 Art Wood
 Art Young

Fictional characters 

 Art Blank, a lawyer from the "Saw" series of splatter films
 Art the Clown, a murderous clown from the "Terrifier" series of slasher films

See also

 Ant (name)
 List of Irish-language given names

References 

Masculine given names
Irish-language masculine given names
Irish masculine given names
English masculine given names